Edward Brian Hudson (born February 9, 1966), also known as Steve Austin, is an American professional stock car racing driver. He last competed full-time in the ARCA Menards Series East, driving the No. 22 Chevrolet SS for CCM Racing.

Racing career

ARCA Menards Series East 
Austin made his ARCA Menards Series East debut in 2022 at New Smyrna Speedway. He failed to finish, coming home 12th. It was announced on 8 May 2022, that Austin would drive full-time in the 2023 ARCA Menards Series East for a new team, Tom Crosby Enterprises. He would be released from CCM Racing shortly after the announcement.

Legal issues 
On 22 May 2022, Austin was arrested and charged with a felony, after violating his parole on 27 April 2021. Austin had a criminal record prior to his arrest, which includes false pretenses, unauthorised taking of a motor vehicle, extortion, and identity theft. He has remained on parole after his latest conviction in North Carolina.

Motorsports career results

ARCA Menards Series East

References

External links 

Living people
1966 births
ARCA Menards Series drivers
NASCAR drivers
Racing drivers from North Carolina
People from Washington, North Carolina
People charged with identity theft